Hugh Graham (born 11 February 1949) is a Canadian equestrian. He competed in two events at the 1984 Summer Olympics.

References

External links
 

1949 births
Living people
Canadian male equestrians
Olympic equestrians of Canada
Equestrians at the 1984 Summer Olympics
Pan American Games medalists in equestrian
Pan American Games gold medalists for Canada
Pan American Games silver medalists for Canada
Equestrians at the 1983 Pan American Games
Equestrians at the 1987 Pan American Games
Sportspeople from Guelph
Medalists at the 1983 Pan American Games
Medalists at the 1987 Pan American Games
20th-century Canadian people
21st-century Canadian people